The 2017–18 Croatian First Football League (officially Hrvatski Telekom Prva liga for sponsorship reasons) was the 27th season of the Croatian First Football League, the national championship for men's association football teams in Croatia, since its establishment in 1992. The season started on 14 July 2017 and ended on 19 May 2018. Rijeka were the defending champions, who have won their first Croatian league title and ended Dinamo Zagreb's consecutive 11-season reign the previous season. Dinamo Zagreb ultimately reclaimed the title by May 2018, their 19th since the league's inception, with Rijeka ending close second.

The league was contested by 10 teams.

Teams
On 21 April 2017, Croatian Football Federation announced that the first stage of licensing procedure for 2017–18 season was complete. For the 2017–18 Prva HNL, only seven clubs were issued a top level license: Dinamo Zagreb, Hajduk Split, Inter Zaprešić, Lokomotiva, Osijek, Rijeka and Slaven Belupo. All of these clubs except Inter Zaprešić were also issued a license for participating in UEFA competitions. In the second stage of licensing, clubs that were not licensed in the first stage can appeal on the decision. On 23 May 2017, it was announced that all remaining Prva HNL clubs except RNK Split were granted top level license. Four teams from Druga HNL acquired the top level license: Gorica, Rudeš, Solin and NK Zagreb.

Stadia and locations

 1 Lokomotiva and Rudeš host their home matches at Stadion Kranjčevićeva as their own grounds failed to get license for top level football. The stadium was originally the home ground of third-level side NK Zagreb.

Teams by county

Personnel and kits

Managerial changes

League table

Results
Each team plays home-and-away against every other team in the league twice, for a total of 36 matches each played.

First round

Second round

Positions by round

Relegation play-offs
At the end of the season, ninth placed team  Istra 1961 will contest a two-legged relegation play-off tie against Varaždin, runners-up of the 2017–18 Croatian Second Football League.

First leg

Second leg

Istra 1961 won 3–2 on aggregate.

Statistics

Top scorers

Awards

Annual awards

References

External links
Official website 
Croatian First League at UEFA.com

2017-18
2017–18 in European association football leagues